O'Brien Provincial Park  is a provincial park in Alberta, Canada, located  south from Grande Prairie, on Highway 666.

It was established on June 29, 1954 and is maintained by Alberta Tourism, Parks and Recreation. The park is named for Lewis O'Brien, a pioneer doctor in the Grande Prairie region and former Member of the Legislative Assembly of Alberta.

Activities
The following activities are available in the park:
Canoeing and kayaking
Fishing (Arctic grayling, bull trout, burbot, emerald shiner, fathead minnow, flathead chub, lake chub, largescale sucker, longnose dace, longnose sucker, mountain whitefish, northern pike, peamouth chub, northern pearl dace, redside shiner, slimy sculpin, spoonhead sculpin, spottail shiner, walleye, white sucker)
Power boating
Swimming

See also
List of provincial parks in Alberta
List of Canadian provincial parks
List of National Parks of Canada

References

External links

Municipal District of Greenview No. 16
Provincial parks of Alberta